Zgornje Pobrežje is a settlement on the right bank of the Savinja River in the Municipality of Rečica ob Savinji in Slovenia. The area belongs to the traditional Styria region and is now included in the Savinja Statistical Region.

References

External links
Zgornje Pobrežje on Geopedia

Populated places in the Municipality of Rečica ob Savinji